Greater New Bedford Regional Vocational-Technical High School (commonly referred to as GNB Voc-Tech, Voc-Tech, or Voc)  is a vocational high school located in New Bedford, Massachusetts, United States for students in grades 912. The school draws its student body from the towns and cities of New Bedford, Dartmouth, and Fairhaven.  It is considered its own school district, thus having an on-site superintendent as well as an academics principal and a vocational-technical principal. Students alternate between six day long career technical and academic cycles.

Students at GNB Voc-Tech experience an education which blends academic instruction with career and technical education. They can choose from more than two dozen career majors. In a typical class, 60-70% of its graduates choose to continue their education, either at colleges or advanced technical schools. Another 30-35% enter the workforce and approximately 2% enter the armed services.

Notable Alumni: Alivia DeMelo and Sequoia Mack https://www.gnbvt.edu/community-2/alumni/

Vocational-Technical Programs
Greater New Bedford Regional Vocational Technical High School offers more than 30 Career and Technical Programs that students can choose from. These career and technical programs are divided into academies based on industry or group of industries.

Academy A: Agriculture & Construction
Heating and Air Conditioning [HVAC-R Appliance Technology] (HT)
Marine Technology & Aviation
Carpentry (CR)
Electrical Technology (EC)
Plumbing (PL)

Academy B: Legal, Life Sciences, & Service
Culinary Arts (CU)
Dental Assisting (DA)
Early Childhood Education and Teaching (ED)
Medical Assisting (MA)
Nurse Assisting and Health Assisting (HS)

Academy C: Consumer Services, Information & Transportation
Automotive Technology (AM)
Collision Repair (CL)
Diesel Technology (DS)
Metal Fabrication and Joining (MJ)
Machine Technology (MT)
Stationary (formerly Steam) Engineering (SE)

Academy D: Arts & Manufacturing
Engineering Technology (EN)
Environmental Science and Technology (ES)
HVAC-R Appliance Technology (HT)
Computer Information Technology (IT)***
Information Support Services and Networking (IS)**
Programming and Web Development (PW)**
Legal and Protective Services (LP)

Arts, Communication, and Consumer Services Cluster (Cluster E)
Business Technology* (BT)
Cosmetology (CS)
Fashion Design (FD)
Media Technology (ME)
Visual Design (VI)

Athletics
Girls softball 2022 state champions
Baseball - MIAA Division ll State Champions (2017)
- 2016 Massachusetts Large School State Vocational Champions
Football - Massachusetts Vocational Large State Champions (2010, 2011)
Boys Soccer - MIAA Division I South Sectional Champions (2011)
Massachusetts Vocational Large State Champions (2004, 2005, 2006, 2007)
Girls Volleyball - Massachusetts Vocactional Large State Champions (2010, 2011)
Boys Volleyball - MIAA Division II Eastern Mass. State Champions (2004, 2006)
Boys Volleyball - MIAA Division I Eastern Mass. State Champions (2009)
Girls Basketball - MIAA Division IV South Sectional Champions (2012), D-IV State Finalists (2013, 2013))
Massachusetts Vocational Large State Champions (2010, 2011, 2012)

References

External links

Vocational education
Schools in Bristol County, Massachusetts
Public high schools in Massachusetts
New Bedford, Massachusetts